Sarah Schlitz (born 7 December 1986, in Liège) is a Belgian politician from Ecolo. She is the current Belgian Secretary of State for Gender equality, Equal opportunity and Diversity in the cabinet of the prime minister Alexander De Croo.

Education and early life 
Sarah Schlitz is born into a family with a political background and is the granddaughter of the former mayor of Liège, Henri Schlitz. She studied at the University of Liège and graduated with a Master of sciences in Political Science, and supplementary masters in Urban Studies and Spatial Development.

Political career 
In Liège, Sarah Schlitz has been involved in grassroots community organizing focusing on ecological, social and feminist politics. She chose to join Ecolo, rather than the Socialist Party of which her grandfather was a member. Between 2015 and 2018, she was campaign coordinator at the ecological association , and from 2016 to 2018 she was co-chair of the Coalition Climat. 

In October 2012, she was elected to the city council of Liège as part of Ecolo. In October 2018, she was reelected as a member of the citizen's movement Vert Ardent. She resigned from the city council in September 2019 in order to focus on her work as a member of the federal Parliament.

In the 2014 general election, she came second with 2.935 votes as a substitute candidate for Ecolo in the Liege constituency. In October 2018, she succeeded Muriel Gerkens, who resigned from parliament. 

In the 2019 parliamentary election, she was elected to the Belgian Federal Parliament with 17.728 votes as Ecolo's chief candidate for the constituency of Liège. 

Since 1 October 2020, she is the State Secretary for Gender Equality, Equal Opportunities and Diversity in the De Croo government.

References 

Ecolo politicians
Living people
Belgian feminists
1986 births
Politicians from Liège
University of Liège alumni
21st-century Belgian politicians
21st-century Belgian women politicians
Belgian city councillors
Members of the Chamber of Representatives (Belgium)